På begäran is a 1990 compilation album from Swedish pop and country singer Kikki Danielsson.

Track listing
Let Them Walk in the Sunshine
En dröm jag vill ha kvar
Amazing Grace
Ge mig sol, ge mig hav
När vi rör varann
John & Jill
Det finns en sol
US of America
Vi skall dansa hela natten
Minnet
Du lovade guld
Comment ça va
Du lever på drömmar
Jag vet vad jag vill
Tag en chans
Kikki Rap (mixed Kikki Danielssons hits)
Papaya Coconut
Rädda pojkar
Det är nu
Jag är på väg (I'm on My Way)

References

1990 compilation albums
Kikki Danielsson compilation albums